The 1904 Florida gubernatorial election was held on November 8, 1904. Democratic nominee Napoleon B. Broward defeated Republican nominee Matthew B. MacFarlane with 79.16% of the vote.

General election

Candidates
Major party candidates
Napoleon B. Broward, Democratic, former Sheriff of Duval County, member of the Jacksonville City Council and the Florida Board of Health
Matthew B. MacFarlane, Republican, unsuccessful 1900 candidate for Governor, US Customs Service collector in Tampa, former Tampa City Council member

Other candidates
W.R. Healey, Socialist, attorney, Socialist Party of Florida Secretary and vice president of the Florida Federation of Labor

Results

Results by county

References

1904
Florida
Gubernatorial